Sauce Viejo Airport  is an airport in Santa Fe Province, Argentina serving the city of Santa Fe.

The new airport was built in 2005. It has a  terminal and parking space for 150 cars. The Sauce Viejo non-directional beacon (Ident: SVO) is located on the field.

Airlines and destinations

See also

Transport in Argentina
List of airports in Argentina

References

External links
OpenStreetMap - Sauce Viejo Airport
Aeropuerto de Sauce Viejo at Organismo Regulador del Sistema Nacional de Aeropuertos 
 
 
Sauce Viejo airport travel data at Airportsdata.net

Airports in Argentina